Mamaa is one of the Finisterre languages of Papua New Guinea, spoken in the village of Mama in Wampar Rural LLG, Morobe Province.

References

Finisterre languages
Languages of Morobe Province